Peart Water is a stream about  long in Somerset, England. It rises in the Quantock Hills and flows in a generally northeast direction. Fish are raised in the Hawkridge Reservoir, and further downstream the Peart Water powers two mills.

Course

Peart Water rises in the Quantock Hills Area of Natural Beauty in West Somerset.

Peart Water flows onward from the dam in a northeast direction to Spaxton, where it enters the Ashford Reservoir. 
The Ashford Reservoir has an elevation of almost .

Uses

The Hawkridge Reservoir is stocked with trout.
This used to power an overshot water wheel, which was replaced in 1934 by an Armfield vertical shafted 18" Francis turbine.
The turnbine was still being used to power a saw bench in 1976.
The stream powers the Twinhill Mill in Spaxton.

Notes

Sources

External links

Rivers of Somerset